Kansa may refer to:

 Kaw people or Kansa, a Native American tribe in Oklahoma and parts of Kansas
 Kansa language, a Siouan language of the Dhegihan group once spoken by the Kaw people
 Kansa or Kamsa, a character in Hindu mythology
 Tapani Kansa (born 1949), a Finnish singer
 Kansa, Bangladesh, a village in Jhalakati District
 Kansa method, a method for the solution of partial differential equations

See also 
 Khansa (disambiguation)

Language and nationality disambiguation pages